Patricia de / De Leon / DeLeon may refer to:
Patricia de la Garza De León (1775–1849), co-founder of Victoria, Texas
Patricia de Leon (actress) (born 1976), Panamanian model and actress
Patricia DeLeon (born 1944), reproductive geneticist